Mohammed Malallah (Arabic:محمد مال الله) (born 21 March 1984) is a Qatari footballer.

External links

References

Qatari footballers
1984 births
Living people
Al-Arabi SC (Qatar) players
Al-Wakrah SC players
Qatar Stars League players
Association football midfielders